The Intendancy of Brittany was an intendancy created in 1689 by Louis XIV, after 2 attempts to do so in 1636 and 1647. The governor of Brittany had a more prestigious role, but the intendant was the essential relay for the monarch's will.

List of holders
 Auguste-Robert de Pomereu, 1689-1692
 Louis de Béchameil, 1692-1705, put in place from the sub-delegates
 Ferrand de Villemilan, 1705-1716
 Paul Esprit Feydeau de Brou, 1716-1728
 Des Gallois de la Tour, 1728-1735
 Pontcarré de Viarmes, 1735-1753
 Le Bret, 1753-1765
 Jacques de Flesselles, 1765-1767
 François Marie Bruno d'Agay, 1767-1771
 Guillaume-Joseph Dupleix de Bacquencourt, 1771-1774
 Gaspard-Louis Caze, baron de la Bove, 1774-1784
 Antoine François de Bertrand-Molleville, 1784-1788
 François-Germain Dufaure de Rochefort, 1788 - resigned to the Directory on 31 August 1790.

Activity of the intendant

Ordinances

Extraordinary missions

History of the institution
(...)

In 1786, the headquarters of the intendance was displaced to Nantes to remove it from the immediate influence of the parliament and the Estates General or their committees.  The towns of Brest, Chateaubriand, Le Croisic, Dinan, La Guerche, Lamballe, Montfort and Saint-Brieuc sent letters of protest in reply to the letter that they had received from the community of Rennes ; the officers of the présidial or the corporations joined this movement, as did the officers of the maîtres-perruquiers.

See also
Intendant

Sources 
 Henri Fréville, L'Intendance de Bretagne (1689–1790). Essai sur l'histoire d'une intendance en Pays d'États au XVIIIe siècle, Thèse. Rennes, Plihon, 1953. 3 vol.
 Séverin Canal, Les origines de l'intendance de Bretagne, H. Champion, Paris, 1911, aussi publié par les Annales de Bretagne de 1911 à 1915.

Notes and references 

History of Brittany